Francisco Cerúndolo defeated Sebastián Báez in the final, 7–6(7–4), 6–2 to win the men's singles tennis title at the 2022 Swedish Open. It was his maiden ATP Tour title.

Casper Ruud was the defending champion, but was defeated by Cerúndolo in the second round.

Seeds
The top four seeds receive a bye into the second round.

Draw

Finals

Top half

Bottom half

Qualifying

Seeds

Qualifiers

Lucky loser

Draw

First qualifier

Second qualifier

Third qualifier

Fourth qualifier

References

External links
Main draw
Qualifying draw

Swedish Open - Men's singles
2022 Men's singles